Emilian Nicula (born 29 May 1963) is a Romanian gymnast. He competed in seven events at the 1984 Summer Olympics.

References

1963 births
Living people
Romanian male artistic gymnasts
Olympic gymnasts of Romania
Gymnasts at the 1984 Summer Olympics
Gymnasts from Bucharest